Dropwort is a common name for several plants and may refer to:

Filipendula vulgaris, an herb in the family Rosaceae, growing in dry meadows in Europe and Asia
Oenanthe, a genus of plants in the family Apiaceae, growing in moist habitats, commonly referred to as water dropworts
Oenanthe crocata, hemlock water dropwort, a poisonous plant native to Europe
Oenanthe javanica, an edible plant native to Asia
Oxypolis, a genus of plants in the family Apiaceae, native to North America
Tiedemannia, a genus of plants in the family Apiaceae